Harrison is an unincorporated community located in the town of Harrison, Lincoln County, Wisconsin, United States.

History
A post office was first established under the name Harrison in 1888. The community was named for Benjamin Harrison, who won the 1888 presidential election and served as 23rd President of the United States.

Notes

Unincorporated communities in Lincoln County, Wisconsin
Unincorporated communities in Wisconsin